Alejandro Javier Frezzotti (born February 15, 1984) is an Argentine football midfielder for Gimnasia y Tiro.

Career

Frezzotti started his career during the 2005-06 seasons playing for Lanús. He only played three games with his first teams and all of them coming on as a substitute. In 2007, he moved to Chacarita Juniors in the Argentine Primera B Nacional (second division). He won promotion with the club and stayed to play during the 2009–10 Argentine Primera División season. However, Chacarita were relegated at the end of the Clausura tournament and Frezzoti left the club to join Gimnasia y Esgrima La Plata.

References

External links
 Alejandro Frezzotti at ESPN Deportes 
 
 FTBL.com
 

1984 births
Living people
Argentine footballers
Argentine expatriate footballers
Association football midfielders
Club Atlético Lanús footballers
Chacarita Juniors footballers
C.D. Cuenca footballers
Club de Gimnasia y Esgrima La Plata footballers
Sporting Cristal footballers
San Luis de Quillota footballers
Barcelona S.C. footballers
Club Atlético Temperley footballers
Gimnasia y Esgrima de Jujuy footballers
S.D. Aucas footballers
Club Atlético Mitre footballers
Manta F.C. footballers
Gimnasia y Tiro footballers
Primera B de Chile players
Primera Nacional players
Argentine Primera División players
Serie B players
Peruvian Primera División players
Ecuadorian Serie A players
Argentine expatriate sportspeople in Chile
Argentine expatriate sportspeople in Peru
Argentine expatriate sportspeople in Italy
Argentine expatriate sportspeople in Ecuador
Expatriate footballers in Chile
Expatriate footballers in Peru
Expatriate footballers in Italy
Expatriate footballers in Ecuador
Sportspeople from Córdoba Province, Argentina